= Sweet Wednesday =

American folk music

- Origin: Boston, Massachusetts, US
- Genres: Folk
- Years active: 2005–present
- Label: Independent
- Members: Dave Falk; Lisa Housman
- Website: www.sweetwednesday.com

Sweet Wednesday is an American folk music duo from Boston, Massachusetts. The duo consists of singer-songwriters Dave Falk (vocals, guitar, mandolin, banjo, violin) and Lisa Housman (vocals, guitar).

== Biography ==
Sweet Wednesday was formed in Boston, Massachusetts in early 2000 when Housman, a folk music artist met and started collaborating with Falk, a rock and blues musician. The duo write and perform in the roots rock, folk, alt country genres, combining elements of comedy, tragedy, and haunting beauty. Their music has been described to contain imagery likened to Joan Baez or Leonard Cohen

== Members ==
- Dave Falk (vocals, guitar, mandolin, banjo, violin)
- Lisa Housman (vocals, guitar)

== Discography ==
Studio albums

- Wherever You Go (2006)
- Escaping from the Pale Moonlight (2012)

== Awards and nominations ==
- First place in the Great American Song Contest
- First place in the Dallas Song Competition
- Runner-up in the John Lennon Songwriting Contest
